Alick Buchanan-Smith may refer to:

Alick Buchanan-Smith, Baron Balerno (1898–1984), British Army officer and scientist
Alick Buchanan-Smith (politician) (1932–1991), his son, British Conservative Member of Parliament